Auburn Riverside High School is located in Auburn, Washington, United States. Located next to the White River, the school takes its name from its location. The school opened in 1995 due to overcrowding at Auburn Senior High School.

Academics
AR offers seventeen Advanced Placement classes: Biology, Chemistry, Physics, Micro Economics, Computer Science, Calculus AB, European History, Human Geography, US History, US Government and Politics, World Studies, English Language/Composition, Literature, AP Seminar, AP Research, Culinary Arts, Spanish, French, Japanese, and German.

Drama

In addition to academics and athletics, ARHS has gained notice for its drama program, under the direction of Karla Gjerde Seman, and currently Kathryn Nuttman. Seman has been a participant in  5th Avenue Theatre's High School Musical Awards since the program's inception in 2003, ARHS has accumulated many awards and nominations.

Athletics
Auburn Riverside joined the Olympic Division of the North Puget Sound League in 2016. They were previously part of the SPSL 3A Central Division since the 2009-10 school year, which was a change from their former SPSL 4A North Division league, as the SPSL decided to split the league into three parts, rather than the previous two.

Recent state tournament results include:
1st place - 2016 & 2017 volleyball, 2015 cheer, 2015 volleyball, 2010 girls' basketball, 2008 girls' basketball, 2007 girls' basketball, and 2013 baseball
2nd place - 2006 gymnastics, 2002 boys' tennis, and 2016 girls' soccer 
3rd place - 2004 girls' fastpitch, 2003 boys' tennis, 2001 boys' tennis, 2009 girls' fastpitch, 2010 girls' water polo, 2009 girls' volleyball, and 2010 boys' cross country
4th place - 2009 girls' basketball, 2004 boys' cross country, 2002 boys' soccer, 2011 girls' water polo
5th place - 2007 wrestling, 2005 boys' tennis, 2005 boys' cross country, and 2012 boys' water polo
6th place - 2004 boys' tennis, 2003 boys' track and field, and 2009 boys' cross country
7th place - 2006 boys' tennis, 2005 boys' cross country, and 2003 boys' cross country, 2012 girls' volleyball
8th place - 2006 girls' cross country, 2007 boys' water polo, and 2011 boys' baseball

Auburn Riverside High School won the Fugate trophy for football in 2011 and 2013.

Notable alumni

Amy Crawford - Miss Auburn 1997 and Miss Washington USA 2005
Ian Crawford - guitarist for Panic! at the Disco
Chris Eylander - soccer player for Seattle Sounders FC
David Paulson - former tight end for Pittsburgh Steelers
Travis Stevens - summer Olympian silver medalist in men's 81 kg judo
Harrison Maurus - weightlifter who competed in the 2020 Summer Olympics
Michael Rucker - MLB pitcher

References

Buildings and structures in Auburn, Washington
Educational institutions established in 1968
Educational institutions established in 1995
High schools in King County, Washington
Public high schools in Washington (state)
South Puget Sound League